Fexhe-le-Haut-Clocher is a municipality of Wallonia located in the province of Liège, Belgium. 

On January 1, 2006, Fexhe-le-Haut-Clocher had a total population of 3,019. The total area is 19.25 km² which gives a population density of 157 inhabitants per km².

The municipality consists of the following districts: Fexhe-le-Haut-Clocher, Freloux, Noville, Roloux, and Voroux-Goreux.

See also
 List of protected heritage sites in Fexhe-le-Haut-Clocher

References

External links
 

Municipalities of Liège Province